The 2018 season was the 11th season for Royal Challengers Bangalore. The side was captained by Virat Kohli and coached by Daniel Vettori.

Offseason

Support staff changes
 In January 2018, the franchise appointed Gary Kirsten as batting coach and Ashish Nehra as bowling mentor.

Others
On 26 March 2018, the franchise onboarded HP Inc India as the principal sponsor of the team. Earlier that month, the franchise had partnered up with Nuvoco Vistas for the solus position on the back of the team jersey.

On 29 March 2018, Royal Challengers Bangalore's home match against Delhi Daredevils on 12 May was moved to Delhi due to the Karnataka Legislative Assembly election on the same day. The away game against the same team on 21 April was moved to Bangalore.

Squad
 Players with international caps are listed in bold.

Administration and support staff
 Owner – United Spirits
 Head coach – Daniel Vettori
 Bowling mentor – Ashish Nehra
 Batting coach - Gary Kirsten
 Fielding Coach - Trent Woodhill
 Bowling Talent Development and Analytics - Andrew McDonald

Season

League table

Results

Statistics

Most runs

 Source: Cricinfo

Most wickets

 Source: Cricinfo

References

Royal Challengers Bangalore seasons
2010s in Bangalore